National Highway 930D, commonly referred to as NH 930D is a national highway in  India. It is a spur road of National Highway 930. NH-930D traverses the state of Maharashtra in India.

Route 
Chandrapur, Visapur, Ballarpur, Bamni, Rajura, Warur Road, Dewada, Lakkdkot and terminating at Maharashtra / Telangana Border.

Junctions  

  Terminal near Chandrapur.
  near Bamni.

See also 

 List of National Highways in India
 List of National Highways in India by state

References

External links 

 NH 930D on OpenStreetMap

National highways in India
National Highways in Maharashtra